The Shion Stakes (Japanese 紫苑ステークス) is a Grade 2 horse race for three-year-old Thoroughbred fillies run in September over a distance of 1800 metres at Nakayama Racecourse.

The race, which serves as a trial race for the Shuka Sho, was first contested in 2000 and has been run at Grade 3 level since 2016. The Shion Stakes was originally run over 1800 metres before the distance was increased to 2000 metres in 2007. The 2002 and 2014 editions were held at Niigata Racecourse. It was promoted to Grade 2 in 2023.

Winners since 2016

Earlier winners

 2000 - Mejiro Marie
 2001 - Lady Pastel
 2002 - Osumi Cosmo
 2003 - Rendo Felice
 2004 - Ingot
 2005 - Cosmo Marvelous
 2006 - Cendrillon
 2007 - Arco Senora
 2008 - Moere Katrina
 2009 - Diana Barows
 2010 - Dear Arethusa
 2011 - Calmato
 2012 - Para La Salud
 2013 - Sekisho
 2014 - Reve d'Etoiles
 2015 - Queens Milagro

See also
 Horse racing in Japan
 List of Japanese flat horse races

References

Turf races in Japan